Jetta is a Chinese car marque created by Volkswagen Group with its joint venture partner FAW Group in 2019. The Volkswagen Jetta is a popular car in China, and the model forms the basis of the new company, with two additional SUV models joining the range.

The Jetta cars are built in Chengdu at an FAW-Volkswagen joint venture plant.

History
At the time when the Jetta brand was introduced, Harald Müller was the company president.

In May 2020, Harald Müller revealed in interviews that there's been interest in the marque brand from outside China. In August 2020, there are plans to potentially export Jetta-branded vehicles outside China, but the company has not disclosed which target markets they want to aim at.

Models
The range consist of the VA3 saloon, the VS5 compact SUV and the VS7 SUV. The cars were designed and developed by Volkswagen in Germany.

While the VA3 is a facelift of the Chinese Volkswagen Jetta (based on the same platform as the SEAT Toledo Mk4), both SUV models, the VS5 and the VS7 are based on the Volkswagen Group compact SUV models including the SEAT Ateca, Škoda Karoq and Volkswagen Tharu.

Sales
67,600 Jetta vehicles were sold in China in the first half of 2020.

References

External links
 

Vehicle manufacturing companies established in 2019
Chinese companies established in 2019
Car brands
Volkswagen Group
FAW Group brands
Companies based in Changchun
Chinese brands